The men's long jump competition at the 2004 Summer Olympics in Athens was held at the Olympic Stadium on 24–26 August. Forty athletes from 30 nations competed. The event was won by Dwight Phillips of the United States, the nation's 21st gold medal in the men's long jump.

Background

This was the 25th appearance of the event, which is one of 12 athletics events to have been held at every Summer Olympics. The returning finalists from the 2000 Games were the defending champion Iván Pedroso of Cuba, fourth-place finisher Olexiy Lukashevych of Ukraine, eighth-place finisher Dwight Phillips of the United States, ninth-place finisher Bogdan Tarus of Romania, and eleventh-place finisher Petar Dachev of Bulgaria. Then, Pedroso was at his peak and Phillips had not yet reached his; now, Phillips was at his peak and Pedroso was past his. Pedroso's string of four straight world championships ended in 2003, when Phillips took over.

Botswana and Panama each made their first appearance in the event. The United States appeared for the 24th time, most of any nation, having missed only the boycotted 1980 Games.

Qualification

The qualification period for Athletics was 1 January 2003 to 9 August 2004. For the men's long jump, each National Olympic Committee was permitted to enter up to three athletes that had jumped 8.19 metres or further during the qualification period. The maximum number of athletes per nation had been set at 3 since the 1930 Olympic Congress. If an NOC had no athletes that qualified under that standard, one athlete that had jumped 8.05 metres or further could be entered.

Competition format

The competition consisted of two rounds, qualification and final. In qualification, each athlete jumped three times (stopping early if they made the qualifying distance). At least the top twelve athletes moved on to the final; if more than twelve reached the qualifying distance of 8.10 metres, all who did so advanced. Distances were reset for the final round. Finalists jumped three times, after which the eight best jumped three more times (with the best distance of the six jumps counted).

Records

, the existing world and Olympic records were as follows.

No new world or Olympic records were set during the competition. The following national records were set during the competition:

Schedule

All times are Greece Standard Time (UTC+2)

Results

Qualifying
Rule: Qualifying standard 8.10 (Q) or at least 12 best qualified (q).

Final

References

External links
Official Olympic Report

M
Long jump at the Olympics
Men's events at the 2004 Summer Olympics